Vladimir Klaić (14 September 1925 – 5 September 1970), nicknamed Glavica, was a Croatian footballer who played as a midfielder and made one appearance for both the Yugoslavia and Croatia national teams.

International career
Klaić earned his first and only cap for Yugoslavia on 16 January 1953 in a friendly against Egypt. The away match, which was played in Cairo, finished as a 1–3 loss. Three years later, he made an appearance for PR Croatia in the team's 1956 friendly match against Indonesia. The fixture, which was played on 12 September in Zagreb, finished as a 5–2 win for Croatia.

Personal life
Klaić died on 5 September 1970 in Zagreb at the age of 44.

Career statistics

International

References

External links
 Profile for Croatia national team
 

1925 births
1970 deaths
Footballers from Zagreb
Yugoslav footballers
Yugoslavia international footballers
Croatian footballers
Croatia international footballers
Dual internationalists (football)
Association football midfielders
NK Zagreb players
Yugoslav First League players